The Church of Christ in Nations (COCIN), formerly Church of Christ in Nigeria, is a Christian denomination in Nigeria. It was founded in 1904. Its current headquarters is in Jos, Plateau State. Its current President is [[Rev. Dr. Amos Mozho. It used to have the name of Ekklesiyar Kristi A Nigeria.

It is a member of the World Council of Churches. Furthermore, it is a member of the Christian Association of Nigeria, the Reformed Ecumenical Council, and the World Alliance of Reformed Churches.

See also
Christianity in Nigeria

References

External links
COCIN Website

Christian denominations in Nigeria
Reformed denominations in Africa
Christian organizations established in 1904
 Members of the World Council of Churches
1904 establishments in the British Empire